In molecular biology, SNORA7 (also known as ACA7) is a member of the H/ACA class of small nucleolar RNA that guide the sites of modification of uridines to pseudouridines.

The family also contains the mouse sequence MBI-141.

References

External links 
 

Small nuclear RNA